Acontiaster is a genus of starfish in the family Benthopectinidae, containing the single species Acontiaster bandanus.

References

Notomyotida
Monotypic echinoderm genera